The 2007 Philadelphia Phillies season was the 125th season in the history of the franchise. It would begin with the Phillies approaching a historic mark.  The Phillies started the year with an MLB-record 9,955 losses in franchise history.  On July 15, they lost their 10,000th game to the St. Louis Cardinals, becoming the first professional sports team in modern history to reach that milestone. The Phillies rallied in the closing days of the season, winning their final game against the Nationals. This win and the New York Mets loss to the Florida Marlins gave them the NL East title. They were swept in the opening round of the postseason by the Colorado Rockies.

Regular season
Trailing the Mets by seven games with seventeen left to play, the Phillies went on a 13–4 stretch that got them the first of five consecutive division championships. It was also the franchise's first playoff appearance since 1993.

National League East

Record vs. opponents

Transactions
September 4, 2007: Pete LaForest was selected off waivers by the Philadelphia Phillies from the San Diego Padres.

Roster

Game log

|- align="center" bgcolor="ffbbbb"
| 1 || April 2 || Braves || 5–3   || Wickman (1–0) || Madson (0–1) || Paronto (1) || 44,742 || 0–1
|- align="center" bgcolor="ffbbbb"
| 2 || April 4 || Braves || 3–2   || McBride (1–0) || Madson (0–2) || Wickman (1) || 41,516 || 0–2
|- align="center" bgcolor="ffbbbb"
| 3 || April 5 || Braves || 8–4 || James (1–0) || Eaton (0–1) || Soriano (1) || 30,062 || 0–3
|- align="center" bgcolor="bbffbb"
| 4 || April 6 || @ Marlins || 8–2 || Moyer (1–0) || Mitre (0–1) || || 40,397 || 1–3
|- align="center" bgcolor="ffbbbb"
| 5 || April 7 || @ Marlins || 8–5 || Willis (2–0) || Myers (0–1) || || 32,419 || 1–4
|- align="center" bgcolor="ffbbbb"
| 6 || April 8 || @ Marlins || 6–4 || Olsen (2–0) || Segovia (0–1) || Gardner (1) || 16,308 || 1–5
|- align="center" bgcolor="ffbbbb"
| 7 || April 9 || @ Mets || 11–5 || Feliciano (1–0) || Geary (0–1) || || 56,227 || 1–6
|- align="center" bgcolor="bbffbb"
| 8 || April 11 || @ Mets || 5–2 || Eaton (1–1) || Pérez (1–1) || Gordon (1) || 41,927 || 2–6
|- align="center" bgcolor="ffbbbb"
| 9 || April 12 || @ Mets || 5–3 || Glavine (2–1) || Moyer (1–1) || Wagner (2) || 33,355 || 2–7
|- align="center" bgcolor="ffbbbb"
| 10 || April 13 || Astros || 9–6 || Oswalt (2–0) || Myers (0–2) || Wheeler (2) || 44,336 || 2–8
|- align="center" bgcolor="bbffbb"
| 11 || April 14 || Astros || 8–5 || Hamels (1–0) || Williams (0–2) || Gordon (2) || 35,387 || 3–8
|- align="center" bgcolor="bbbbbb"
| – || April 15 || Astros || colspan=5|Postponed (rain) – made up April 23 || 3–8
|- align="center" bgcolor="bbbbbb"
| – || April 16 || Mets || colspan=5|Postponed (rain) – made up June 29 || 3–8
|- align="center" bgcolor="ffbbbb"
| 12 || April 17 || Mets || 8–1 || Glavine (3–1) || García (0–1) || || 27,058 || 3–9
|- align="center" bgcolor="ffbbbb"
| 13 || April 18 || @ Nationals || 5–4   || Speigner (1–0) || Rosario (0–1) || || 18,584 || 3–10
|- align="center" bgcolor="bbffbb"
| 14 || April 19 || @ Nationals || 4–2 || Moyer (2–1) || Patterson (0–3) || Gordon (3) || 18,671 || 4–10
|- align="center" bgcolor="ffbbbb"
| 15 || April 20 || @ Reds || 2–1   || Coutlangus (1–0) || Gordon (0–1) || || 32,962 || 4–11
|- align="center" bgcolor="bbffbb"
| 16 || April 21 || @ Reds || 4–1 || Hamels (2–0) || Milton (0–3) || || 39,353 || 5–11
|- align="center" bgcolor="bbffbb"
| 17 || April 22 || @ Reds || 9–3 || García (1–1) || Belisle (2–1) || || 29,717 || 6–11
|- align="center" bgcolor="bbffbb"
| 18 || April 23 || Astros || 11–4 || Eaton (2–1) || Sampson (2–1) || || 32,517 || 7–11
|- align="center" bgcolor="bbffbb"
| 19 || April 24 || Nationals || 6–3 || Alfonseca (1–0) || Bowie (0–1) || Gordon (4) || 24,745 || 8–11
|- align="center" bgcolor="bbffbb"
| 20 || April 25 || Nationals || 9–3 || Lieber (1–0) || Patterson (0–4) || || 23,526 || 9–11
|- align="center" bgcolor="ffbbbb"
| 21 || April 26 || Nationals || 4–2 || Hill (2–2) || Hamels (2–1) || Cordero (2) || 26,572 || 9–12
|- align="center" bgcolor="bbffbb"
| 22 || April 27 || Marlins || 6–5 || Gordon (1–1) || Messenger (0–1) || || 32,331 || 10–12
|- align="center" bgcolor="ffbbbb"
| 23 || April 28 || Marlins || 11–5 || Willis (5–1) || Eaton (2–2) || || 36,914 || 10–13
|- align="center" bgcolor="bbffbb"
| 24 || April 29 || Marlins || 6–1 || Moyer (3–1) || Obermueller (1–1) || || 45,107 || 11–13
|- align="center" bgcolor="ffbbbb"
| 25 || April 30 || @ Braves || 5–2 || González (1–0)|| Alfonseca (1–1)  || || 20,354 || 11–14

|- align="center" bgcolor="bbffbb"
| 26 || May 1 || @ Braves || 6–4 || Hamels (3–1) || Redman (0–4) || Gordon (5) || 19,670 || 12–14
|- align="center" bgcolor="ffbbbb"
| 27 || May 2 || @ Braves || 4–3 || Paronto (1–0) || García (1–2) || Soriano (2) || 23,647 || 12–15
|- align="center" bgcolor="bbffbb"
| 28 || May 3 || @ Giants || 9–7 || Eaton (3–2) || Cain (1–2) || Myers (1) || 33,466 || 13–15
|- align="center" bgcolor="ffbbbb"
| 29 || May 4 || @ Giants || 6–2 || Morris (4–1) || Moyer (3–2) || || 39,265 || 13–16
|- align="center" bgcolor="ffbbbb"
| 30 || May 5 || @ Giants || 9–4 || Lowry (4–2) || Lieber (1–1) || || 40,796 || 13–17
|- align="center" bgcolor="bbffbb"
| 31 || May 6 || @ Giants || 8–5 || Hamels (4–1) || Chulk (0–2) || Myers (2) || 38,738 || 14–17
|- align="center" bgcolor="ffbbbb"
| 32 || May 7 || @ D-backs || 4–3 || Lyon (3–1) || Rosario (0–2) || Valverde (12) || 19,592 || 14–18
|- align="center" bgcolor="ffbbbb"
| 33 || May 8 || @ D-backs || 3–2 || Owings (2–1) || Eaton (3–3) || Peña (1) || 22,888 || 14–19
|- align="center" bgcolor="bbffbb"
| 34 || May 9 || @ D-backs || 9–3 || Moyer (4–2) || Medders (1–1) || Myers (3) || 25,286 || 15–19
|- align="center" bgcolor="bbffbb"
| 35 || May 11 || Cubs || 7–2 || Hamels (5–1) || Hill (4–2) || || 42,473 || 16–19
|- align="center" bgcolor="bbffbb"
| 36 || May 12 || Cubs || 11–7 || Alfonseca (2–1) || Howry (0–3) || || 45,026 || 17–19
|- align="center" bgcolor="ffbbbb"
| 37 || May 13 || Cubs || 4–1 || Lilly (3–2) || Lieber (1–2) || Dempster (8) || 45,129 || 17–20
|- align="center" bgcolor="bbffbb"
| 38 || May 14 || Brewers || 8–6 || Condrey (1–0) || Turnbow (1–1) || Myers (4) || 29,183 || 18–20
|- align="center" bgcolor="bbffbb"
| 39 || May 15 || Brewers || 4–3 || Myers (1–2) || Turnbow (1–2) || || 41,258 || 19–20
|- align="center" bgcolor="bbffbb"
| 40 || May 16 || Brewers || 6–2 || Hamels (6–1) || Suppan (5–4) || || 42,713 || 20–20
|- align="center" bgcolor="ffbbbb"
| 41 || May 17 || Brewers || 3–2 || Sheets (4–2) || García (1–3) || Cordero (16) || 31,553 || 20–21
|- align="center" bgcolor="bbffbb"
| 42 || May 18 || Blue Jays || 5–3 || Lieber (2–2) || McGowan (0–1) || Myers (5) || 34,723 || 21–21
|- align="center" bgcolor="ffbbbb"
| 43 || May 19 || Blue Jays || 13–2 || Marcum (2–2) || Moyer (4–3) || || 32,004 || 21–22
|- align="center" bgcolor="bbffbb"
| 44 || May 20 || Blue Jays || 5–3 || Eaton (4–3)  || Litsch (1–1) || Myers (6) || 39,030 || 22–22
|- align="center" bgcolor="ffbbbb"
| 45 || May 22 || @ Marlins || 5–3 || Olsen (4–3) || Hamels (6–2) || Gregg (4) || 11,162 || 22–23
|- align="center" bgcolor="bbffbb"
| 46 || May 23 || @ Marlins || 8–7   || Condrey (2–0) || Gregg (0–2) || || 11,575 || 23–23
|- align="center" bgcolor="ffbbbb"
| 47 || May 24 || @ Marlins || 5–4   || Gardner (1–2) || Rosario (0–3) || || 11,811 || 23–24
|- align="center" bgcolor="bbffbb"
| 48 || May 25 || @ Braves || 8–3 || Moyer (5–3) || Hudson (5–3) || || 35,402 || 24–24
|- align="center" bgcolor="bbffbb"
| 49 || May 26 || @ Braves || 6–4 || Eaton (5–3) || Carlyle (0–1) || Alfonseca (1) || 40,122 || 25–24
|- align="center" bgcolor="bbffbb"
| 50 || May 27 || @ Braves || 13–6 || Hamels (7–2) || Davies (2–3) || || 38,058 || 26–24
|- align="center" bgcolor="ffbbbb"
| 51 || May 28 || D-backs || 5–4 || Davis (3–6) || García (1–4) || Lyon (2) || 41,985 || 26–25
|- align="center" bgcolor="ffbbbb"
| 52 || May 29 || D-backs || 11–5 || Owings (4–1) || Lieber (2–3) || || 27,643 || 26–26
|- align="center" bgcolor="ffbbbb"
| 53 || May 30 || D-backs || 4–3 || Johnson (3–2) || Moyer (5–4) || Valverde (19) || 33,281 || 26–27

|- align="center" bgcolor="ffbbbb"
| 54 || June 1 || Giants || 13–0 || Morris (6–2) || Eaton (5–4) || || 38,164 || 26–28
|- align="center" bgcolor="bbffbb"
| 55 || June 2 || Giants || 5–2 || Hamels (8–2) || Lowry (5–5) || || 45,153 || 27–28
|- align="center" bgcolor="bbffbb"
| 56 || June 3 || Giants || 9–8 || Alfonseca (3–1) || Correia (1–2) || || 39,293 || 28–28
|- align="center" bgcolor="ffbbbb"
| 57 || June 4 || Giants || 8–1 || Zito (6–5) || Lieber (2–4) || || 33,967 || 28–29
|- align="center" bgcolor="bbffbb"
| 58 || June 5 || @ Mets || 4–2   || Geary (1–1) || Feliciano (1–1) || Alfonseca (2) || 43,078 || 29–29
|- align="center" bgcolor="bbffbb"
| 59 || June 6 || @ Mets || 4–2 || Eaton (6–4) || Heilman (5–3) || Alfonseca (3) || 42,696 || 30–29
|- align="center" bgcolor="bbffbb"
| 60 || June 7 || @ Mets || 6–3   || Zagurski (1–0) || Schoeneweis (0–1) ||  Alfonseca (4) || 43,398 || 31–29
|- align="center" bgcolor="ffbbbb"
| 61 || June 8 || @ Royals || 8–4 || Elarton (2–2) || García (1–5) || Dotel (3) || 19,121 || 31–30
|- align="center" bgcolor="bbffbb"
| 62 || June 9 || @ Royals || 4–0 || Lieber (3–4) || Meche (3–6)  || || 23,734 || 32–30
|- align="center" bgcolor="ffbbbb"
| 63 || June 10 || @ Royals || 17–5 || Greinke (3–4) || Moyer (5–5) || || 16,034 || 32–31
|- align="center" bgcolor="bbffbb"
| 64 || June 11 || White Sox || 3–0 || Eaton (7–4) || Vázquez (3–5) || Alfonseca (5) || 31,989 || 33–31
|- align="center" bgcolor="bbffbb"
| 65 || June 12 || White Sox || 7–3 || Hamels (9–2) || Contreras (4–7) || || 34,529 || 34–31
|- align="center" bgcolor="bbffbb"
| 66 || June 13 || White Sox || 8–4 || Madson (1–2) || Thornton (2–2) || || 42,677 || 35–31
|- align="center" bgcolor="ffbbbb"
| 67 || June 15 || Tigers || 12–8 || Bonderman (7–0) || Lieber (3–5) || || 42,719 || 35–32
|- align="center" bgcolor="bbffbb"
| 68 || June 16 || Tigers || 6–3 || Moyer (6–5) || Miller (2–1) ||  || 45,102 || 36–32
|- align="center" bgcolor="ffbbbb"
| 69 || June 17 || Tigers || 7–4 || Verlander (7–2) || Geary (1–2) || Jones (17) || 45,537 || 36–33
|- align="center" bgcolor="ffbbbb"
| 70 || June 18 || @ Indians || 10–1 || Lee (3–4) || Hamels (9–3) || || 18,710 || 36–34
|- align="center" bgcolor="bbffbb"
| 71 || June 19 || @ Indians || 9–6 || Kendrick (1–0) || Stanford (1–1) || || 17,371 || 37–34
|- align="center" bgcolor="ffbbbb"
| 72 || June 20 || @ Indians || 10–6 ||  Sabathia (10–2) || Lieber (3–6) || || 24,278 || 37–35
|- align="center" bgcolor="bbffbb"
| 73 || June 22 || @ Cardinals || 6–0 || Moyer (7–5) || Reyes (0–9) || || 45,360 || 38–35
|- align="center" bgcolor="ffbbbb"
| 74 || June 23 || @ Cardinals || 8–3 || Wainwright (6–6) || Eaton (7–5) || || 45,336 || 38–36
|- align="center" bgcolor="bbffbb"
| 75 || June 24 || @ Cardinals || 5–1 || Sanches (1–0) || Thompson (5–3) || || 44,899 || 39–36
|- align="center" bgcolor="bbffbb"
| 76 || June 26 || Reds || 11–4 || Kendrick (2–0) || Bailey (2–1) || || 35,314 || 40–36
|- align="center" bgcolor="ffbbbb"
| 77 || June 27 || Reds || 9–6 || McBeth (2–1) || Sanches (1–1) || Weathers (15) || 31,803 || 40–37
|- align="center" bgcolor="bbffbb"
| 78 || June 28 || Reds || 8–7   || Condrey (3–0) || Santos (1–3) || || 44,323 || 41–37
|- align="center" bgcolor="ffbbbb"
| 79 || June 29 || Mets || 6–5 || Hernández (4–3) || Durbin (0–1) || Wagner (16) || 35,849 || 41–38
|- align="center" bgcolor="ffbbbb"
| 80 || June 29 || Mets || 5–2 || Maine (9–4) || Hamels (9–4) || || 45,165 || 41–39
|- align="center" bgcolor="ffbbbb"
| 81 || June 30 || Mets || 8–3 || Sosa (7–3) || Happ (0–1) || Feliciano (1) || 45,003 || 41–40

|- align="center" bgcolor="bbffbb"
| 82 || July 1 || Mets || 5–3 || Kendrick (2–0) || Pelfrey (0–6) || Alfonseca (6) || 45,289 || 42–40
|- align="center" bgcolor="ffbbbb"
| 83 || July 2 || @ Astros || 7–5 || Williams (4–10) || Moyer (7–6) || Miller (1) || 28,973 || 42–41
|- align="center" bgcolor="ffbbbb"
| 84 || July 3 || @ Astros || 5–4   || Albers (2–4) || Mesa (0–1) || || 37,993 || 42–42
|- align="center" bgcolor="bbffbb"
| 85 || July 4 || @ Astros || 8–3 || Hamels (10–4) || Sampson (6–6) || || 39,993 || 43–42
|- align="center" bgcolor="ffbbbb"
| 86 || July 6 || @ Rockies || 7–6   || Corpas (3–2) || Durbin (0–2) || || 29,239 || 43–43
|- align="center" bgcolor="ffbbbb"
| 87 || July 7 || @ Rockies || 6–3 || López (5–2) || Moyer (7–7) || Corpas (1) || 35,196 || 43–44
|- align="center" bgcolor="bbffbb"
| 88 || July 8 || @ Rockies || 8–4 || Eaton (8–5) || Cook (5–6) || Madson (1) || 25,119 || 44–44
|- align="center" bgcolor="bbffbb"
| 89 || July 13 || Cardinals || 13–3 || Kendrick (4–0) || Wells (3–12) || || 43,838 || 45–44
|- align="center" bgcolor="bbffbb"
| 90 || July 14 || Cardinals || 10–4 || Hamels (11–4) || Maroth (5–4) || || 45,050 || 46–44
|- align="center" bgcolor="ffbbbb"
| 91 || July 15 || Cardinals || 10–2 || Wainwright (8–7) || Eaton (8–6) || || 44,872 || 46–45
|- align="center" bgcolor="ffbbbb"
| 92 || July 16 || @ Dodgers || 10–3 || Penny (11–1) || Moyer (7–8) || || 41,458 || 46–46
|- align="center" bgcolor="bbffbb"
| 93 || July 17 || @ Dodgers || 15–3 || Durbin (1–2) || Hendrickson (4–5) || || 45,074 || 47–46
|- align="center" bgcolor="ffbbbb"
| 94 || July 18 || @ Dodgers || 5–4 || Seánez (6–1) || Kendrick (4–1) || Saito (25) || 47,114 || 47–47
|- align="center" bgcolor="ffbbbb"
| 95 || July 19 || @ Padres || 1–0 || Young (9–3) || Hamels (11–5) || Hoffman (27) || 30,885 || 47–48
|- align="center" bgcolor="bbffbb"
| 96 || July 20 || @ Padres || 7–3 || Eaton (9–6) || Germano (6–4) || Alfonseca (7) || 36,113 || 48–48
|- align="center" bgcolor="bbffbb"
| 97 || July 21 || @ Padres || 12–4 || Moyer (8–8) || Wells (5–6) || || 40,917 || 49–48
|- align="center" bgcolor="bbffbb"
| 98 || July 22 || @ Padres || 9–0 || Durbin (2–2) || Peavy (9–5) || || 37,986 || 50–48
|- align="center" bgcolor="bbffbb"
| 99 || July 24 || Nationals || 4–3 || Madson (2–2) || Ayala (0–2) || Alfonseca (8) || 40,110 || 51–48
|- align="center" bgcolor="bbffbb"
| 100 || July 25 || Nationals || 7–5   || Condrey (4–0) || Booker (0–1) || || 44,931 || 52–48
|- align="center" bgcolor="ffbbbb"
| 101 || July 26 || Nationals || 7–6 || Rauch (6–2) || Mesa (1–3) || Cordero (20) || 43,413 || 52–49
|- align="center" bgcolor="bbffbb"
| 102 || July 27 || Pirates || 8–1  || Moyer (9–8) || Van Benschoten (0–5) || || 37,136 || 53–49
|- align="center" bgcolor="bbffbb"
| 103 || July 28 || Pirates || 10–5 || Durbin (3–2) || Youman (2–3) || || 45,149 || 54–49
|- align="center" bgcolor="bbffbb"
| 104 || July 29 || Pirates || 5–1 || Kendrick (5–1) || Snell (7–9) || || 40,030 || 55–49
|- align="center" bgcolor="bbffbb"
| 105 || July 30 || @ Cubs || 4–1 || Hamels (12–5) || Lilly (11–5) || Myers (7) || 41,686 || 56–49
|- align="center" bgcolor="ffbbbb"
| 106 || July 31 || @ Cubs || 7–3 || Marquis (8–6) ||  Eaton (9–7) || || 40,495 || 56–50

|- align="center" bgcolor="ffbbbb"
| 107 || August 1 || @ Cubs || 5–4 || Dempster (2–3) || Myers (1–3) || || 40,558 || 56–51
|- align="center" bgcolor="bbffbb"
| 108 || August 2 || @ Cubs || 10–6 || Durbin (4–2) || Marshall (5–5) || || 40,988 || 57–51
|- align="center" bgcolor="ffbbbb"
| 109 || August 3 || @ Brewers || 2–1 || Gallardo (4–1) || Kendrick (5–2) || Cordero (33) || 39,483 || 57–52
|- align="center" bgcolor="ffbbbb"
| 110 || August 4 || @ Brewers || 6–5 || Turnbow (3–4) || Gordon (1–2) || Cordero (34) || 42,126 || 57–53
|- align="center" bgcolor="bbffbb"
| 111 || August 5 || @ Brewers || 8–6   || Myers (2–3) || Parra (0–1) || Mesa (1) || 43,716 || 58–53
|- align="center" bgcolor="bbffbb"
| 112 || August 7 || Marlins || 11–1 || Moyer (10–8) || VandenHurk (3–3) || Durbin (1) || 32,791 || 59–53
|- align="center" bgcolor="bbffbb"
| 113 || August 8 || Marlins || 6–4 || Lohse (7–12) || Willis (7–12) || Myers (8) || 34,139 || 60–53
|- align="center" bgcolor="ffbbbb"
| 114 || August 9 || Marlins || 4–2 || Tankersley (5–1) || Myers (2–4) || Gregg (24) || 37,009 || 60–54
|- align="center" bgcolor="bbffbb"
| 115 || August 10 || Braves || 5–4 || Hamels (13–5) || Moylan (4–2) || Gordon (6) || 40,844 || 61–54
|- align="center" bgcolor="ffbbbb"
| 116 || August 11 || Braves || 7–5 || Mahay (1–0) || Eaton (9–8) || Wickman (19) || 44,948 || 61–55
|- align="center" bgcolor="bbffbb"
| 117 || August 12 || Braves || 5–3 || Moyer (11–8) || Carlyle (7–4) || Myers (9) || 45,053 || 62–55
|- align="center" bgcolor="bbffbb"
| 118 || August 14 || @ Nationals || 3–2 || Alfonseca (4–1) || Rauch (8–3) || Myers (10) || 27,128 || 63–55
|- align="center" bgcolor="ffbbbb"
| 119 || August 15 || @ Nationals || 4–2 || Redding (2–3) || Kendrick (5–3) || Cordero (27) || 25,575 || 63–56
|- align="center" bgcolor="bbffbb"
| 120 || August 16 || @ Nationals || 4–2 || Hamels (14–5) || Hanrahan (2–1) || Myers (11) || 27,308 || 64–56
|- align="center" bgcolor="bbffbb"
| 121 || August 17 || @ Pirates || 11–8 || Durbin (5–2) || Gorzelanny (11–7) || || 37,072 || 65–56
|- align="center" bgcolor="ffbbbb"
| 122 || August 18 || @ Pirates || 11–6 || Maholm (9–14) || Moyer (11–9) || || 38,152 || 65–57
|- align="center" bgcolor="ffbbbb"
| 123 || August 19 || @ Pirates || 8–4 || Snell (8–10) || Romero (1–1) ||  || 31,277 || 65–58
|- align="center" bgcolor="bbffbb"
| 124 || August 21 || Dodgers || 5–4 || Kendrick (6–3) || Tomko (2–11) || Myers (12) || 35,326 || 66–58
|- align="center" bgcolor="ffbbbb"
| 125 || August 22 || Dodgers || 15–3 || Lowe (10–11) || Durbin (5–3) ||  || 37,321 || 66–59
|- align="center" bgcolor="ffbbbb"
| 126 || August 23 || Dodgers || 5–2 || Billingsley (8–4) || Romero (1–2) || Saito (34) || 37,875 || 66–60
|- align="center" bgcolor="ffbbbb"
| 127 || August 24 || Padres || 14–3 || Maddux (10–9) || Moyer (11–10) || || 39,023 || 66–61
|- align="center" bgcolor="ffbbbb"
| 128 || August 25 || Padres || 4–3 || Bell (6–4) || Myers (2–5) || Hoffman (33) || 37,957 || 66–62
|- align="center" bgcolor="bbffbb"
| 129 || August 26 || Padres || 14–2 || Kendrick (7–3) || Stauffer (0–1) || Ennis (1) || 39,362 || 67–62
|- align="center" bgcolor="bbffbb"
| 130 || August 27 || Mets || 9–2 || Durbin (6–3) || Lawrence (1–2) || || 38,165 || 68–62
|- align="center" bgcolor="bbffbb"
| 131 || August 28 || Mets || 4–2   || Myers (3–5) || Mota (1–1) || || 40,508 || 69–62
|- align="center" bgcolor="bbffbb"
| 132 || August 29 || Mets || 3–2 || Moyer (12–10) || Pérez (12–9) || Myers (13) || 43,150 || 70–62
|- align="center" bgcolor="bbffbb"
| 133 || August 30 || Mets || 11–10 || Gordon (2–2) || Wagner (2–2) || || 42,552 || 71–62
|- align="center" bgcolor="bbffbb"
| 134 || August 31 || @ Marlins || 9–2 || Kendrick (8–3) || Mitre (5–8) || || 15,231 || 72–62

|- align="center" bgcolor="ffbbbb"
| 135 || September 1 || @ Marlins || 12–6 || Kim (8–6) || Durbin (6–4) || Gregg (27) || 24,651 || 72–63
|- align="center" bgcolor="ffbbbb"
| 136 || September 2 || @ Marlins || 7–6 || Miller (5–0) || Davis (0–1) || Gregg (28) || 12,334 || 72–64
|- align="center" bgcolor="ffbbbb"
| 137 || September 3 || @ Braves || 5–1 || Cormier (2–4) || Moyer (12–11) || || 31,592 || 72–65
|- align="center" bgcolor="bbffbb"
| 138 || September 4 || @ Braves || 5–2 || Lohse (8–12) || Carlyle (8–6) || Myers (14) || 22,130|| 73–65
|- align="center" bgcolor="ffbbbb"
| 139 || September 5 || @ Braves || 9–8 || Soriano (3–3) || Myers (3–6) || || 22,115 || 73–66
|- align="center" bgcolor="ffbbbb"
| 140 || September 7 || Marlins || 6–3 || Kim (9–6) || Durbin (6–5) || Gregg (29) || 38,696 || 73–67
|- align="center" bgcolor="bbffbb"
| 141 || September 8 || Marlins || 9–1 || Condrey (5–0) || VandenHurk (4–6) || || 38,559 || 74–67
|- align="center" bgcolor="bbffbb"
| 142 || September 9 || Marlins || 8–5 || Moyer (13–11) || Willis (8–15) || Myers (15) || 32,574 || 75–67
|- align="center" bgcolor="bbffbb"
| 143 || September 10 || Rockies || 6–5   || Myers (4–6) || Buchholz (6–5) || || 25,046 || 76–67
|- align="center" bgcolor="ffbbbb"
| 144 || September 11 || Rockies || 8–2 || Morales (1–2) || Eaton (9–9) || || 25,263 || 76–68
|- align="center" bgcolor="ffbbbb"
| 145 || September 12 || Rockies || 12–0 || Redman (1–4) || Kendrick (8–4) || || 31,541 || 76–69
|- align="center" bgcolor="bbffbb"
| 146 || September 13 || Rockies || 12–4 || Geary (2–2) || Francis (15–8) || || 42,623 || 77–69
|- align="center" bgcolor="bbffbb"
| 147 || September 14 || @ Mets || 3–2   || Gordon (3–2) || Heilman (7–7) || Myers (16) || 53,730 || 78–69
|- align="center" bgcolor="bbffbb"
| 148 || September 15 || @ Mets || 5–3 || Alfonseca (5–1) || Sosa (9–7) || Myers (17) || 55,477 || 79–69
|- align="center" bgcolor="bbffbb"
| 149 || September 16 || @ Mets || 10–6 || Geary (3–2) || Mota (2–2) || || 52,779 || 80–69
|- align="center" bgcolor="bbffbb"
| 150 || September 17 || @ Cardinals || 13–11 || Kendrick (9–4) || Thompson (6–6) || Rosario (1) || 42,031 || 81–69
|- align="center" bgcolor="bbffbb"
| 151 || September 18 || @ Cardinals || 7–4   || Mesa (2–3) || Maroth (5–7) || Condrey (1) || 42,170 || 82–69
|- align="center" bgcolor="ffbbbb"
| 152 || September 19 || @ Cardinals || 2–1   || Flores (3–0) || Myers (4–7) || || 44,337 || 82–70
|- align="center" bgcolor="bbffbb"
| 153 || September 20 || @ Nationals || 7–6 || Romero (2–2) || Albaladejo (1–1) || Myers (18) || 19,966 || 83–70
|- align="center" bgcolor="bbffbb"
| 154 || September 21 || @ Nationals || 6–3 || Eaton (10–9) || Hill (4–5) || Myers (19) || 26,949 || 84–70
|- align="center" bgcolor="bbffbb"
| 155 || September 22 || @ Nationals || 4–1   || Myers (5–7) || Schroder (2–3) || Condrey (2) || 26,412 || 85–70
|- align="center" bgcolor="ffbbbb"
| 156 || September 23 || @ Nationals || 5–3 || Ayala (2–2) || Alfonseca (5–2) || Cordero (36) || 40,519 || 85–71
|- align="center" bgcolor="ffbbbb"
| 157 || September 25 || Braves || 10–6 || Bennett (2–0) || Moyer (13–12) || || 39,129 || 85–72
|- align="center" bgcolor="bbffbb"
| 158 || September 26 || Braves || 5–2 || Lohse (9–12) || Hudson (16–10) || Myers (20) || 36,588 || 86–72
|- align="center" bgcolor="bbffbb"
| 159 || September 27 || Braves || 6–4 || Kendrick (10–4) || Smoltz (14–8) || Myers (21) || 40,589 || 87–72
|- align="center" bgcolor="bbffbb"
| 160 || September 28 || Nationals || 6–0 || Hamels (15–5) || Redding (3–6) || || 45,084 || 88–72
|- align="center" bgcolor="ffbbbb"
| 161 || September 29 || Nationals || 4–2 || Chico (7–9) || Eaton (10–10) || Cordero (37) || 44,532 || 88–73
|- align="center" bgcolor="bbffbb"
| 162 || September 30 || Nationals || 6–1 || Moyer (14–12) || Bergmann (6–6) || || 44,865 || 89–73

Player stats

Batting
Note: G = Games played; AB = At bats; R = Runs; H = Hits; 2B = Doubles; 3B = Triples; HR = Home runs; RBI = Runs batted in; SB = Stolen bases; BB = Walks; AVG = Batting average; SLG = Slugging average

Source:

Pitching
Note: W = Wins; L = Losses; ERA = Earned run average; G = Games pitched; GS = Games started; SV = Saves; IP = Innings pitched; H = Hits allowed; R = Runs allowed; ER = Earned runs allowed; BB = Walks allowed; SO = Strikeouts

Source:

Playoffs

NLDS

Awards
Jimmy Rollins won the Baseball Digest Player of the Year, the NL Most Valuable Player Award, the NLBM Oscar Charleston Legacy Award (NL MVP), the Philadelphia Sports Writers Association ("Outstanding Pro Athlete"), the John Wanamaker Athletic Award from the Philadelphia Sports Congress (summer 2008; for the 2007 calendar year), and the Pride of Philadelphia Award from the Philadelphia Sports Hall of Fame.

The NL Rawlings Gold Glove Award was won by Rollins (shortstop) and Aaron Rowand (outfield). The NL Silver Slugger Award was won by Chase Utley (second base) and Rollins (shortstop). Carlos Ruiz was named to the Topps All-Star Rookie team, at catcher.

The Philadelphia chapter of the Baseball Writers' Association of America (BBWAA) presented its annual franchise awards to Jimmy Rollins ("Mike Schmidt Most Valuable Player Award"), Cole Hamels ("Steve Carlton Most Valuable Pitcher Award"), Larry Shenk ("Dallas Green Special Achievement Award"), and Aaron Rowand ("Tug McGraw Good Guy Award").

The Philadelphia Sports Writers Association presented awards to broadcaster Harry Kalas ("Living Legend Award") and public-relations director Larry Shenk ("Lifetime Achievement Award").

Farm system 

LEAGUE CHAMPIONS: Clearwater

References

Game Logs:
1st Half: Philadelphia Phillies Game Log on ESPN.com
2nd Half: Philadelphia Phillies Game Log on ESPN.com
Batting Statistics: Philadelphia Phillies Batting Stats on ESPN.com
Pitching Statistics: Philadelphia Phillies Pitching Stats on ESPN.com

2007 Philadelphia Phillies at Baseball Reference

National League East champion seasons
Philadelphia Phillies seasons
Philadelphia Phillies season
Philadelphia Phillies